Evarcha falcata is a species of 'jumping spiders' belonging to the family Salticidae.

Taxonomy
Evarca falcata (Clerk, 1757) is considered by some authors a complex of three sibling species - E. falcata s.str., Evarcha proszynskii Marusik & Logunov, 1998, Evarcha hoyi (Peckham & Peckham, 1883) - and their range is largely allopatric.

Subspecies
Two subspecies are currently recognised: 
Evarcha falcata nigrofusca (Strand, 1900) (Norway)
Evarcha falcata xinglongensis Yang & Tang, 1996 (China)

Distribution
This species is present in the Palearctic realm, from Europe, Turkey, Caucasus, Afghanistan, and Russia to Kazakhstan and China.

Habitat
These jumping spiders prefers dry habitats, especially the sunny edges of forests with dense vegetation, grass, shrubbery, clearings and sparse woodlands.

Description
In these medium sized spiders the upper side of the cephalothorax (prosoma) of the male is light brown in the anterior half, dark brown or black in the back half. Behind the eyes and at the sides of the cephalothorax there are wide, light beige, or white stripes. The center of the abdomen (opisthosoma)  is light brown, framed by black and white stripes. The two central eyes of the face are rather large. The frontal area of the eyes is covered with light hairs. Also pedipalps are covered with longer, light hairs. Legs are light brown.

Females differ from males also in color (Sexual dimorphism). Cephalothorax and abdomen are densely covered with brown hairs, without any light or black stripes and spots. On the abdomen of the males there is sometimes an indistinct drawing of bright oblique spots, similarly to Evarcha arcuata , but the latter has longer white hairs on the face.

Biology and behavior
Adult of both sexes  can be found from March to November.  They are diurnal jumping spiders with a good visual and hunting ability. These spiders hide mainly in the lower tier of vegetation. They move in the thick of the grass, looking for their prey. During mating the male climbs the female backwards and in this condition moves along with the female for a long time. Then the male moves down to the side and inserts the pedipalps into the external genital structure of the female (epigyne).

Gallery

Bibliography
Clerck, 1757 : Svenska spindlar, uti sina hufvud-slågter indelte samt under några och sextio särskildte arter beskrefne och med illuminerade figurer uplyste. Stockholmiae, p. 1-154.
Heiko Bellmann: Kosmos-Atlas Spinnentiere Europas. = Spinnentiere Europas. 2. Auflage. Franckh-Kosmos, Stuttgart 2001, 
Yang & Tang, 1996 : Three new species of family Salticidae from Gansu, China (Araneae). Journal of Lanzhou University Natural Sciences, vol. 32, p. 104-106.

References

External links
Photos of Evarcha falcata at Eurospiders
 Invertebrated Online

Spiders described in 1757
Taxa named by Carl Alexander Clerck
Salticidae
Spiders of Europe
Spiders of Asia
Spiders of China
Articles containing video clips
Palearctic spiders